Thálatta! Thálatta! ( — "The Sea! The Sea!") was the shouting of joy when the roaming Ten Thousand Greeks saw Euxeinos Pontos (the Black Sea) from Mount Theches (Θήχης) in Trebizond, after participating in Cyrus the Younger's failed march against the Persian Empire in the year 401 BC. The mountain was only a five-day march away from the friendly coastal city Trapezus. The story is told by Xenophon in his Anabasis.

Linguistics
Thálatta (θάλαττα, pronounced ) is the Attic form of the word. In Ionic, Doric, Koine, Byzantine, and Modern Greek it is thálassa (θάλασσα).

Legacy
Heinrich Heine uses the cry in his cycle of poems Die Nordsee published in Buch der Lieder in 1827.

The cry is mentioned by the narrator of Frederick Amadeus Malleson's translation of Jules Verne's Journey to the Center of the Earth, when the titular expedition discovers an underground ocean. It is absent from the original French work.

The phrase appears in Book 1 of James Joyce's 1922 novel Ulysses when Buck Mulligan, looking out over Dublin Bay, says to Stephen Dedalus, "God! ... Isn't the sea what Algy calls it: a great sweet mother? The snotgreen sea. The scrotumtightening sea. Epi oinopa ponton. Ah, Dedalus, the Greeks! I must teach you. You must read them in the original. Thalatta! Thalatta! She is our great sweet mother. Come and look." In Book 18, Molly Bloom echoes the phrase in the closing moments of her monologue: "and O that awful deepdown torrent O and the sea the sea crimson sometimes like fire." In book III.3 of Finnegans Wake this is echoed as "kolossa kolossa!" combining the original chant with Greek kolossal, colossal.

Iris Murdoch wrote a novel called The Sea, The Sea, which won the Booker Prize in 1978.

Anabasis 
Sol Yurick’s 1965 novel that inspired Walter Hill's 1979 film of the same name, The Warriors, was based on Anabasis, and the movie references this quotation near the end, as the titular gang stands on a Coney Island beach and their leader (Michael Beck) comments, "When we see the ocean, we figure we're home."

The shout briefly appears in Lionel Dunsterville's memoir The Adventures of Dunsterforce (1920), when, after passing Rasht, Dunsterville's small force reaches the Caspian Sea:

See also
 List of Greek phrases

References

Anabasis (Xenophon)
Greek words and phrases